Ch'iyara Ch'ankha (Aymara ch'iyara black, ch'ankha wool cord, "black wool cord", also spelled Chiara Chanca) is a  mountain in the Andes of Bolivia. It is situated in the Oruro Department, Pantaleón Dalence Province, Huanuni Municipality. Ch'iyara Ch'ankha lies between  Janq'u Qalani and Ñuñu Qullu in the northwest and Muru Qullu and Juch'uy Yaritani in the south and southeast. The Jalantaña River flows along its eastern side.

References 

Mountains of Oruro Department